Laisa Masuhud Alamia (born ) is a Filipino politician and lawyer who is a member of the interim Bangsamoro Parliament. She is also the Minority Leader of the regional parliament.

A lawyer, she was Executive Secretary of the defunct Autonomous Region in Muslim Mindanao (ARMM), ARMM Social Welfare Secretary, and is the first ARMM Regional Human Rights Commission chairperson. She is also a Tausug from Basilan.

Alamia was nominated for the position of Speaker of the Bangsamoro Transition Authority Parliament. She lost to Pangalian Balindong and became Minority Leader of the regional parliament on March 29, 2019.

She was appointed as chair of the Task Force for Decommissioned Combatants and their Communities (TFDCC) which is tasked to oversee the decommissioning of the Moro Islamic Liberation Front.

References

Members of the Bangsamoro Transition Authority Parliament
Living people
Filipino Muslims
Year of birth missing (living people)
Tausūg people
21st-century Filipino women politicians
Filipino women lawyers
21st-century Filipino lawyers
21st-century women lawyers